The 1980–81 NBA season was the Clippers' 11th season in the NBA and their 3rd season in the city of San Diego.

Draft picks

Roster
{| class="toccolours" style="font-size: 95%; width: 100%;"
|-
! colspan="2" style="background-color: #87CEEB;  color: #FF8C00; text-align: center;" | San Diego Clippers roster
|- style="background-color: #FF8C00; color: #87CEEB;   text-align: center;"
! Players !! Coaches
|-
| valign="top" |
{| class="sortable" style="background:transparent; margin:0px; width:100%;"
! Pos. !! # !! Nat. !! Name !! Ht. !! Wt. !! From
|-

Roster Notes
 Center Bill Walton missed the entire season due to a left foot injury.
 This is Gar Heard's second tour of duty with the franchise.  He previously played for the Buffalo Braves from 1973 to 1976.

Regular season

Season standings

Notes
 z, y – division champions
 x – clinched playoff spot

Record vs. opponents

Game log

Player statistics

Awards, records and milestones

Awards
 Guard Brian Taylor led the league in 3-point field goal percentage this season at .383 (44/115)

Week/Month

All-Star

Season

Records

Milestones

Transactions
The Clippers were involved in the following transactions during the 1980–81 season.

Trades

Free agents

Additions

Subtractions

References

Los Angeles Clippers seasons
San